List of the National Register of Historic Places listings in Salem County, New Jersey


This is intended to be a complete list of properties and districts listed on the National Register of Historic Places in Salem County, New Jersey. The locations of National Register properties and districts (at least for all showing latitude and longitude coordinates below) may be seen in an online map.

|}

See also
National Register of Historic Places listings in New Jersey
List of National Historic Landmarks in New Jersey

References

Salem